Frederick Winslow "Fritz" Faurot Jr. (March 18, 1909 – December 12, 2000) was an American football player and coach. He then served as the head football coach at Northeast Missouri State Teachers College—commonly known at the time as Kirksville State Teachers College and now known as Truman State University—from 1935 to 1937, Parsons College from 1938 to 1941, Central College—now known as Central Methodist University—in 1946, and Murray State University from 1948 to 1955, compiling a career college football coach record of 78–52–10. Faurot played college football at the University of Missouri, lettering in 1930 and 1932. He served as a lieutenant commander in the United States Navy, as an instructor in the physical training program, during World War II. He was the brother of College Football Hall of Fame coach, Don Faurot.

Head coaching record

References

External links
 

1909 births
2000 deaths
Missouri Tigers football players
Central Methodist Eagles football coaches
Murray State Racers football coaches
Parsons Wildcats football coaches
Truman Bulldogs football coaches
High school football coaches in Missouri
United States Navy personnel of World War II
United States Navy officers
People from Mountain Grove, Missouri